Ashot IV Bagratuni, better known as Ashot Msaker ("Ashot the Meat Eater / the Carnivorous"), reputedly for his refusal to refrain from eating meat during Lent, was an Armenian prince from the Bagratid family. A fugitive from the failed uprising in 775 against Arab rule in Armenia, where his father was killed, over the next decades he gradually expanded his domains and established a predominant role for himself in the country's affairs, becoming recognized by the Abbasid Caliphate as presiding prince of Armenia from 806 until his death in 826.

Life 
Ashot IV was the son of Smbat VII, presiding prince of Arab-ruled Armenia. Smbat had participated in the rebellion against the Abbasid Caliphate, and had been killed in the disastrous Battle of Bagrevand in 775. Following the battle, Ashot fled from the family's traditional lands in eastern Armenia north to his relatives near the sources of the Araxes river, where he was further from Arab power and closer to the Byzantine Empire. There he also possessed silver mines, which allowed him to buy some of the lands of the Kamsarakan family and establish a new lordship around the fortress of Bagaran, in the province of Ayrarat.

The demise or exile of so many princely families (nakharar) after Bagrevand left a power vacuum in the southern Caucasus: in part this was filled by Arab settlers, who by the early 9th century had established a series of larger or smaller emirates in the region, but among the greatest beneficiaries were the Artsruni, a formerly middle-ranking nakharar family that now came to control most of south-eastern Armenia (Vaspurakan). At the same time, through skilful diplomacy and marriage alliances, Ashot managed to re-establish the Bagratids as the main nakharar family alongside the Artsrunis. The appointment was designed both as a counterweight to the increasingly powerful Artsruni, as well as a focus for Armenian loyalties away from Byzantium, where many families had fled after 775. At about the same time, the Caliph recognized another Bagratid branch, under Ashot I Curopalates, as princes of Caucasian Iberia.

Taking advantage of the turmoil in the Caliphate after the death of Harun al-Rashid in 809 and during the ensuing civil war, Ashot was able to greatly expand his lands and authority. Ashot's rise was challenged by another ambitious family, the Muslim Jahhafids. The family's founder, Jahhaf, was a newcomer in Armenia who had established a considerable power base for himself by claiming Mamikonian lands through his marriage with a daughter of Mushegh VI Mamikonian, one of the Armenian leaders killed at Bagrevand. Ashot twice defeated the Jahhafids in Taron and Arsharunik. In the process he gained not only Taron (which Jahhaf had seized from another Bagratid, Vasak) and Arsharunik with Shirak (which he had earlier bought from the Kamsarakans), but also Ashotz, and eastern Tayk. Frustrated, Jahhaf and his son Abd al-Malik openly rebelled against the Caliphate by seizing the Armenian capital, Dvin, in 813, and unsuccessfully besieging the caliphal governor at Bardaa. Ashot defeated an army of 5,000 sent against him by Abd al-Malik, killing 3,000 of them, while Ashot's brother Shapuh raided the environs of Dvin. As Abd al-Malik prepared to march and confront Shapuh, the local populace rebelled and killed him.

The death of Abd al-Malik "marked the victory of the Bagratids over their most dangerous enemies" (Ter-Ghewondyan), and left Ashot as the greatest landholder among the nakharar. He further secured his position by concluding strategic marriage alliances, giving one of his daughters to the Artsruni prince of Vaspurakan, and another to the emir of Arzen.

By the time of his death in 826, Ashot had effected a remarkable transformation in his fortunes: as Joseph Laurent comments, the "proscribed and dispossessed" fugitive of Bagrevand died as the "most powerful and most popular prince of Armenia". His possessions were divided among his sons. The eldest, Bagrat II Bagratuni, received Taron and Sasun and later the title of ishkhan ishkhanats ("prince of princes"), whereas his brother, Smbat VIII the Confessor, became the sparapet (commander-in-chief) of Armenia and received the lands around Bagaran and the Araxes.

References

Sources 
 
 
 
 

8th-century births
826 deaths
8th-century Armenian people
9th-century Armenian people
9th-century kings of Armenia
9th-century monarchs in Asia
Ashot
Year of birth unknown
Vassal rulers of the Abbasid Caliphate
Ashot